Thoracibidion buquetii is a species of beetle in the family Cerambycidae.

References

Neoibidionini
Beetles described in 1867